Gold Toe Brands, Inc., is the third-largest United States based producer of socks, producing more than 140 million pairs of socks annually.

History 
Gold Toe was founded by Fritz S. Stern, Fritz Bendheim and J. Kuglemanin in Bally, Pennsylvania on September 18, 1919, under the name Great American Knitting Mills. In 1923, Rudolf Abrams, a cousin of Fritz Stern's wife, joined the company. 

During the Great Depression, Gold Toe began manufacturing men's dress socks with a toe made from high quality Irish linen, which made their product resistant to holes and fraying. In the 1930s, the company added gold acetate thread to the toes of its socks in order to make it visually distinctive on store shelves.  

The manufacturer changed its name to Gold Toe Brands Inc. in 2002. 

Gold Toe merged with later competitor Moretz in 2006 to form Gold Toe Moretz. Gildan Activewear acquired the company in 2011. The following year, they partnered with advertising agency, DeVito/Verdi, to “revitalize and contemporize” the brand.

Operations 
The company's operations headquarters is located in Burlington, North Carolina, with executive headquarters in New York City. Gold Toe Brands, Inc. has shifted much of its manufacturing to China, particularly the Zhejiang province.  

Although its primary market is men's dress socks, Gold Toe Brands has expanded to other segments of the sock market, including women's and kids. In 1983, it added a line of women's socks, then in 1986 it began producing boys' socks. In 1992, the brand started making women's tights.

Gold Toe socks are on the American Podiatric Medical Association's approved list of brands for foot health.

See also

List of sock manufacturers

References

Companies based in North Carolina
Hosiery brands
Socks